Tillandsia vernicosa is a species of flowering plant in the Bromeliaceae family. This species is native to Bolivia, Argentina and Paraguay.

Cultivars 
 Tillandsia 'Evita'

References 

vernicosa
Flora of South America
Epiphytes
Plants described in 1887
Taxa named by John Gilbert Baker